Richard Aldrich (July 31, 1863 – June 2, 1937) was an American music critic. From 1902–23, he was music critic for The New York Times.

Early life
Richard Aldrich was born on July 31, 1863 in Providence, Rhode Island. His father was Elisha S. Aldrich and his mother, Anna E. Gladding. He attended Providence High School and graduated with an A.B. in 1885 from Harvard College, where he had studied music.

Career
He began his journalistic career on the Providence Journal. From 1889 to 1891, he was private secretary to Senator Nathan F. Dixon III in Washington, D.C., writing criticisms for the Washington Evening Star. In 1891–92 he was with the New York Tribune in various editorial capacities, assisting Henry Edward Krehbiel with musical criticisms. He was associated with Krehbiel as an American contributor to the revised edition of Grove's Dictionary of Music and Musicians.

Personal life
In 1906, he was married to Margaret Livingston Chanler, daughter of John Winthrop Chanler (1826–1877) of the Dudley–Winthrop family and Margaret Astor Ward (1838–1875) of the Astor family. Margaret Livingston Chanler served as a nurse with the American Red Cross during the Spanish–American War.
They had two children, a daughter and a son:

 Margaret Aldrich (1911-2011), who married Christopher Rand in 1934. She later married Byron DeMott (d. 1963).
 Richard Chanler Aldrich (1909-1961), who married Susan Cutler (d. 1998), the daughter of John Wilson Cutler and Rosalind (née Fish) Cutler, and the granddaughter of Hamilton Fish II.

Aldrich died on June 2, 1937 in Rome, Italy.

Publications
 Guide to Parsifal (Ditson, 1904)
 Guide to the Ring of the Nibelung (Ditson, 1905)
 Translator of Lilli Lehmann's How to Sing (Macmillan 1912)
 Musical Discourse (1928)
 Concert Life in New York 1902–1923 (1941)

References

External links

 A biographical sketch of composer Jan Albert van Eyken written by Aldrich in a score of van Eyken's Three Sonatas for Organ; from Sibley Music Library Digital Scores Collection
 A biographical sketch of Paganini written by Aldrich in a score of Paganini's Le streghe (the witches’ dance) for violin and orchestra (or piano); from Sibley Music Library Digital Scores Collection
 Guide to Richard Aldrich's collection of musical autographs at Houghton Library, Harvard University
 Guide to Richard Aldrich papers at Houghton Library, Harvard University
 Richard Aldrich family letters from colleagues, 1904-1937 at Isham Memorial Library, Harvard University
 
 
 

1863 births
1937 deaths
Writers from Providence, Rhode Island
Harvard College alumni
American music critics
Opera critics
Pupils of John Knowles Paine
Chanler family
Members of the American Academy of Arts and Letters